Rune Legend is a Windows Phone 7 puzzle game developed by Dreadlocks Ltd with the game's setting being inspired by Norse mythology.

Gameplay
The player places differently shaped rune stones on the game board. Your goal is to place the different shaped rune stones on the board to completely fill the game board in. When the game board is filled in you complete the level. The levels increase in difficulty. In the story mode of the game after completing each level you unlock a unique rune stone. The game also features the swift time mode or multiplayer mode and various challenges to accomplish.

Features

 6 different game modes
 Unlimited generated mode
 Optional difficulty
 Background story based on Norse legends
 24 collectible rune stones with magical powers
 Detailed graphics

Awards 

 Winner of 5th App Parade

Availability

The full version of Rune Legend is available on Microsoft Store, an online game market, for $0.99.

References

2011 video games
Puzzle video games
Indie video games
Video games developed in the Czech Republic
Windows Phone games